Daniel Oskar Ehbudzhuo (born 4 January 2002) is a Ukrainian professional footballer of Nigerian descent who plays as a right-back.

Career
Born in Kupiansk Raion, Ehbudzhuo began his career in the neighbouring Metalist Kharkiv and after continued in the Shakhtar Donetsk academy.

He played in the Ukrainian Premier League Reserves and never made his debut for the senior Shakhtar Donetsk's squad. In July 2021 Ehbudzhuo signed a year loan contract with the Ukrainian Second League's side Vovchansk and made the debut for this team as a start-squad player in a home draw against Metalurh Zaporizhzhia on 25 July 2021.

References

External links
 
 

2002 births
Living people
Sportspeople from Kharkiv Oblast
Ukrainian people of Nigerian descent
Ukrainian footballers
Ukraine youth international footballers
Association football defenders
FC Shakhtar Donetsk players
FC Vovchansk players
Ukrainian Second League players